The second season of Airtel Super Singer Junior – Thamizhagathin Chellakuralukkana Thedal premiered on 21 June 2009. The music competition reality TV show was again telecast on Vijay TV, and Bharti Airtel returned to sponsor the show. Episodes were telecast between Monday and Thursday each week at 9:00 pm. Children aged 6 years to 14 showcased their singing talent. The show initially promised that its winner would receive  25 lakhs (2.5 million Rupees) in prize money, which was later changed to a villa in Anugraha Satellite Town valued at 25 lakhs by its sponsor, Navashakthi Township and Developers.

Following playback singer Chinmayi's decision to stop hosting Vijay TV's Super Singer earlier in the year, various television anchors including Dhivyadarshini (DD), Sivakarthikeyan, Aishwarya Prabhakar, and Uma Padmanabhan hosted the show at various intervals, and playback singer Dhivyadarshini (DD) appeared regularly during the season as a replacement. Ananth Vaidyanathan returned as a voice trainer, and playback singer K. S. Chithra returned as a permanent judge of the show. Playback singers Mano, and Malgudi Subha also joined the show as permanent judges to replace Usha Uthup who quit the show.

A number of eminent playback singers and music directors appeared during the season as guest judges, including P. B. Sreenivas, P. Susheela, M. S. Viswanathan, S. Janaki, Sadhana Sargam, Nithyasree Mahadevan, Suchithra, Harish Raghavendra, Unni Menon, Madhu Balakrishnan, Sowmya, Pop Shalini, and Pushpavanam Kuppuswamy. Stars from the senior version of the show also appeared as judges during the season, including former contestants Naresh Iyer, Nikhil Mathew, and Ajeesh, and permanent judges P. Unnikrishnan, Anuradha Sriram and Srinivas.  The winner Alka Ajith, was introduced as a playback singer in the 2011 Malayalam-language film The Train.

Grand opening 
The grand opening week was hosted by Malini and Yugendran. Former contestants from Airtel Super Singer 2008 and the debut season of Airtel Super Singer Junior participated in a week-long competition to promote and celebrate the opening of season 2 of the show.

Auditions

Open auditions
Open auditions for the season commenced in Coimbatore, Tamil Nadu, according to the then-official website of the show. Contestants in each round were either spot-selected, rejected, or wait-listed until the conclusion of that round. Each of these rounds were hosted by Divyadarshini.

Main level auditions

Contestants 

Alka Ajith  – known in the competition as Alka, she is from Kerala. She had a repertoire of 200 songs at the start of the competition. Alka placed into the grand finale by the permanent judges and was named the winner of the competition.
Shravan R. Pratap – known in the competition as Shravan, he was born to a family from Kerala. He was learning Carnatic music from Padma Chandilyan (wife of mridangamist Srimushnam V. Raja Rao) and had performed Carnatic music concerts before entering the competition. Shravan was placed into the grand finale by the permanent judges and was named runner-up, winning a car. He subsequently competed in spin-off versions of the show and other Vijay TV music competitions.
Nithyashree Venkataraman – known in the competition as Nithyashree, she entered the competition at age 9. She was eliminated as a semi-finalist but immediately qualified as a wild-card contestant and re-entered the competition by popular vote and a decision of the permanent judges. Nithyashree ultimately tied for fourth place with Roshan. Shortly after the finale, she was selected to host special post-final episodes of the show. In subsequent seasons she appeared as a guest performer and backing vocalist, and competed in other Vijay TV music competitions; she won Kedi Boys Killadi Girls, was on the winning team of the first two seasons of Super Singer T20, and finished as runner-up of the second season of Indian Idol Junior.
Roshan – was born to a family hailing from Kerala. He was placed into the grand finale by the permanent judges, and tied for fourth-place. He subsequently competed in spin-off versions of the show and other Vijay TV music competitions. His younger brother Robin has appeared as a contestant in Sun Singer broadcast by Sun TV and in season 4 of Airtel Super Singer Junior.
Srikanth – was the youngest finalist of the season. He was initially eliminated but returned as a wildcard contestant, and the permanent judges made an exception to allow him to re-enter the competition as he appeared to be popular at the time. Srikanth was given the title "Most Popular Contestant" of the season, and finished in third place. He subsequently appeared as a competitor on Airtel Super Singer T20.
Srinisha Jayaseelan – Eliminated from the competition as a semi-finalist. She later appeared as a guest performer and backing vocalist in subsequent seasons of the show, and competed in other Vijay TV music competitions. She was on the winning team of the second season of Super Singer T20.
Priyanka NK – Initially eliminated from the competition as a quarter-finalist, she qualified as a wild-card contestant; viewers protested the judges' decision to eliminate her again before the finale. Nevertheless, Priyanka was recognised at the finale. She later appeared as a guest performer and backing vocalist in subsequent seasons of the show, and competed in other Vijay TV music competitions. Priyanka later went on to become a playback singer, winning the Vijay TV Best Female Singer award and Mirchi Music award. She has sung in movies for Illayaraja, AR Rahman, D Imman, G.V. Prakash and other music directors too.
Shrihari – He appeared as a contestant during season 1 of the show. In season two he was eliminated from the top 11. Although he qualified as a wild-card contestant, he was eliminated again before the finale.
Prasanna Sundar – was eliminated from the top 7 finalists.
Sharath Rajagopalan – known as Sharath during the competition, he was eliminated from the top 9 finalists.
Sahana – She received training in Carnatic music prior to entering the competition. She was eliminated from the top 10 finalists.
Balasarangan – eliminated from the top 12 finalists.
Ovviya – previously appeared on Jaya TV's Ragamalika series. Ovviya was eliminated from the top 13 finalists.
Vishnucharan – was eliminated from the top 14 finalists.
Sowmya – eliminated from the top 8 finalists. She won the best western singer award of the season, giving an outstanding performance of Mayya Maya. She later appeared on other Vijay TV music competitions.
Sivaranjani – eliminated from the top 19 contestants.
Sanjana – She was eliminated from the top 20 finalists.

Top 25 contestant IDs 
The top 25 contestants were selected from the final round of auditions.

Monisha
Alka Ajith
Balasarangan
Sahana
Manisha
Prasanna Sundar
Sowmya
Oviya
Vishnucharan
Sivaranjani
Nithyashree
Harish
Shri Prasanna
Sanjana
Shravan
Srinisha Jayaseelan
Shrihari
Sharath
Roshan
Srikanth
Priyanka
Soundarya
Sathyanarayanan
Srinidhi
Ponmozhi

Main competition 

The main competition comprised a series of performance rounds on successive weeks, from 23 September 2009 to 27 May 2010, with occasional break weeks.  Typically each round had four episodes telecast Monday to Thursday, with a contestant eliminated at the end of the last show that week.

Freestyle round 
 Compere: Divya
 Permanent Judges: Malgudi Subha, Mano, and K. S. Chithra
 Performances:

This round required the top 25 contestants to perform a song of their choice.

Navarathiri special 
 Compere: Divya
 Permanent judges: K. S. Chithra, Malgudi Subha, and Mano 
 Performances:

The top 25 contestants were required to provide duet or trio performances in celebration of the Hindu festival Navarathri.

For the episodes telecast on 29 and 30 September, musical performances were of a South Indian theme. Unlike usual weeks, the contestants and guest performers sat on seats at one side of the stage so that the Bharatha Natyam students who were dancing to the song took centre stage.

In the episode telecast on 1 October, the art of daandiya was taught to contestants by Mansi Bhat who together with the judges and host danced on stage before the commencement of music performances. Musical performances were of a North Indian theme.

 – Non-competition performance

Koothu songs 
 Compere: Divya
 Permanent judges: K. S. Chithra, Mano and Malgudi Subha
 Special guest judge and voice trainer for the week: Manikka Vinayagam
 Performances:

The 5–8 October round required the 25 contestants to perform songs of a koothu style. Those selected in the top five were safe from elimination. At the conclusion of the performances, the judges eliminated a contestant from the competition.

 – Non-competition performance
 – Contestant spot-selected into top-five zone with immunity this week 
 – Contestant was in the bottom three 
 – Contestant was eliminated

Deepavali special 
 Compere: Divyadarshini and Priyadarshini
 Guest judges: Anuradha Sriram and Srinivas 
 Performances:

There was no elimination in this show on 14 October.

Melody round 
 Compere: Divya
 Permanent voice trainer: Ananth Vaidyanathan
 Permanent judges: K. S. Chithra, Mano and Malgudi Subha
 Contestants trained by former Super Singer winners: Nikhil Mathew and Ajeesh
 Performances:

The 19–22 October round required the 24 remaining contestants to perform melody-based songs. The 22 October episode featured compositions of A. R. Rahman. The top-five performers were safe from elimination. At the conclusion of the performances, the judges eliminated a contestant.

 – Non-competition performance
 – Contestant spot-selected into top five with immunity this week (Shravan, Priyanka, Srikanth)
 – Contestant was in the bottom five (Sathyanarayanan, Ponmozhi, Sanjana, Harish and Sivaranjani)
 – Contestant was eliminated

Rain songs 
 Compere: Divya
 Permanent judges: K. S. Chithra and Mano 
 Contestants trained by former Super Singer winners: Nikhil Mathew and Ajeesh
 Performances:

The 26–29 October round required the 23 remaining contestants to perform songs which fit the theme of rain.

 – Non-competition performance
 – Contestant spot-selected into top 5 with immunity this week 
 – Contestant was in the bottom three 
 – Contestant was eliminated

Non-Tamil songs 
 Compere: Divya
 Permanent judges: K. S. Chithra, Mano and Malgudi Subha
 Contestants trained by former Super Singer winners: Nikhil Mathew and Ajeesh
 Performances:

The 2–5 November round had the theme of Pira Mozhi Paadalgal. The 22 remaining contestants were required to perform songs which were in a language other than Tamil. At the conclusion of the week, a contestant was eliminated.

 – Non-competition performance  
 – Contestant spot-selected to advance to next round with immunity (Sharath [1])
 – Contestant was in the bottom four 
 – Contestant was eliminated

Pleasant melody songs 
 Compere: Divya
 Permanent judges: Mano (9–11 November episodes only), K. S. Chithra and Malgudi Subha 
 Special guest judge: Jency
 Guest trainers (former Super Singer winners): Nikhil Mathew and Ajeesh
 Performances:

The 9–12 November round required the 21 remaining contestants to perform Raajaavin Ramyamaana Raagangal from movies released in the 1970s and 1980s. The 10 November episode celebrated the 44th birthday of judge Mano, with his family appearing on the show.

 – Non-competition performance  
 – Contestant spot-selected to advance to next round with immunity (Sowmya)
 – Contestant was in the bottom two 
 – Contestant was eliminated

Boys vs girls round 
 Compere: Divyadarshini and Deepak
 Permanent voice trainer: Ananth Vaidyanathan
 Permanent judges: K. S. Chithra, Mano and Malgudi Subha 
 Performances:

The 16–19 November round divided the 20 remaining contestants into a team of males and another of females. Voice trainer Ananth Vaidyanathan, who trained contestants in the latter rounds of the previous season, began training this season's contestants. He requested the judges to not eliminate any contestants this week, and the judges agreed.

Mottukalin Mettukal round 
 Compere: Divya
 Permanent voice trainer: Ananth Vaidyanathan
 Permanent judges: Mano and K. S. Chithra 
 Performances:

The 23–25 November episodes featured a Mottukalin Mettukal round for the remaining 20 contestants. At the end of this week's performance, Sanjana was eliminated from the competition.

Carnatic classical round 
 Compere: Divya
 Permanent voice trainer: Ananth Vaidyanathan
 Special guest judges: Nithyasree Mahadevan and P. Unnikrishnan 
 Performances:

The 30 November – 2 December round celebrated the Hindu festival Karthigai Deepam, and required the 19 remaining contestants to sing film songs which fit in the Carnatic music ("classical") genre.

Carnatic music advocate and playback singer Nithyasree Mahadevan made her first appearance on the show as a special guest judge for this round. The special guest judges granted four contestants immunity from this week's elimination. Students receiving formal training in Bharatha Natyam danced while each contestant performed.

At the conclusion of this week's performances, the special guest judges decided to waitlist the bottom five contestants and would not eliminate any contestant based on their performances. Consequently, the bottom five contestants were required to perform in a "waitlist challenge" the following week, at which time an elimination would be decided.

 – Non-competition performance 
 – Contestant spot-selected to advance to next round
 – Contestant was in the bottom five

Rajnikanth special 
 Compere: Divya
 Permanent voice trainer: Ananth Vaidyanathan
 Permanent judges: K. S. Chithra, Mano and Malgudi Subha 
 Performances:

The bottom five contestants from the previous week were required to perform in a "waitlist challenge" in the first episode of the week. SSJ09 Vishnucharan was ill and considered the weakest performer, but the judges decided the contestant should receive immediate formal training in Carnatic music for his development as a musician rather than being eliminated.

The remaining episodes of 7–10 December round required the 19 contestants to perform songs from movies which starred Rajinikanth in celebration of his birthday. At the conclusion of the week, another contestant was eliminated.

 – Non-competition performance
 – Contestant lost and was eliminated (no other bottom performers this week)

Duets 
 Compere: Badava Gopi and Haritha Gopi (melody round) and Sivakarthikeyan and Aishwarya (peppy round)
 Permanent voice trainer: Ananth Vaidyanathan
 Permanent judges: K. S. Chithra, Mano and Malgudi Subha 
 Performances:

For the 14–17 December round, the remaining 18 contestants were required to perform duet performances:  first a "melody" song then a "peppy" song. Contestants who were spot-selected by the judges were seated on the "silver sofa", designating them as guest performers in next week's show, receiving immunity from this and next week's eliminations.

 – Non-competition performance
 – Contestant spot-selected to advance to next round
 – Contestant was in the bottom four but not eliminated
 – Contestant was eliminated

Christmas special 
 Compere: Divya
 Permanent voice trainer: Ananth Vaidyanathan
 Permanent judges: K. S. Chithra, Mano and Malgudi Subha 
 Performances:
The 21–24 December special round was a non-elimination showcase by all 25 of the main competition contestants.

Playback singer debut songs 
 Compere: Divya
 Permanent voice trainer: Ananth Vaidyanathan
 Permanent judges: K. S. Chithra and Malgudi Subha 
 Appearances by guest playback singers: Srinivas, Srimathumitha, Unni Menon, audio visual from Karthik, P. Unnikrishnan, Ramya NSK, audio visual from Harini, audio visual from Deepan Chakravarthy, Haricharan, audio visual from Sunitha Sarathy, and audio visual from Anuradha Sriram.
 Performances:

The 28–31 December round required the remaining 17 contestants to perform songs which various South Indian singers had used to debut as playback singers in Tamil cinema ( "Kollywood"). Sharath and Ovviya were not required to compete as they had been granted immunity from the previous week's duet round. Additionally, five contestants were spot selected. Consequently, one contestant was eliminated from the remaining ten contestants.
 
 – Non-competition performance 
 – Contestant spot-selected to advance to next round
 – Contestant was in the bottom three
 – Contestant was eliminated

New Year specials  
 Compere: Divya
 Performances:

In special episodes on 31 December 2009 and 1 January 2010, the remaining 16 contestants performed with former contestants of the junior and senior versions of the show. This was a non-elimination round with no judges.

Dance attack 
 Compere: Divya
 Permanent voice trainer: Ananth Vaidyanathan
 Permanent judges: Mano and Malgudi Subha 
 Performances:

The 4–7 January round.

Village songs 
 Compere: Divya
 Permanent voice trainer: Ananth Vaidyanathan
 Permanent judges: K. S. Chithra, Mano and Malgudi Subha 
 Performances:

The 11–14 January round was in celebration of the Pongal festival, and required contestants to perform Graamiya Padalgal.

DJ mix 
 Compere: Divya
 Permanent voice trainer: Ananth Vaidyanathan
 Permanent judges: K. S. Chithra, Mano and Malgudi Subha 
 Performances:

The 18–21 January round required the remaining 15 contestants to sing old film songs which had been remixed in new films. Film stars Karthi and Andrea Jeremiah made their first appearance on the show to promote the movie Aayirathil Oruvan.

At the end of the week's performances, the bottom four contestants were waitlisted and required to perform in a waitlist challenge at the beginning of the following round.

 – Non-competition performance  
 – Contestant was in the bottom four

Patriotic songs 
 Compere: Divya
 Permanent voice trainer: Ananth Vaidyanathan
 Permanent judges: K. S. Chithra, Mano and Malgudi Subha 
 Special guest: V. S. Kalyanam (assistant to the late Mahatma Gandhi)
 Performances:

The episode telecast on 25 January featured the waitlist challenge between the bottom four contestants from the previous week's performances. However, there was no elimination. The judges warned the weakest performers, Sowmya and Ovviya, that either would be eliminated if a bottom performer again.

The 26–28 January episodes featured performances of songs penned by poet Subramania Bharathiyar and other songs of Indian patriotism. Personal secretary to the late Mahatma Gandhi, Mr V.S. Kalyanam, appeared as a special guest. At the conclusion of the performances, in celebration of the Independence Day theme, no contestants were eliminated.

Kings and queens 
 Compere: Sivakarthikeyan (Tenali) and Aishwarya (Perazhagi)
 Permanent voice trainer: Ananth Vaidyanathan (Rajaguru)
 Permanent judges: Mano (Raja) and Malgudi Subha (Rani)
 Performances:

The 1–4 February round required the remaining 15 contestants to perform songs on a theme of kings and queens. The comperes, voice trainer, permanent judges, and contestants dressed as ancient Indian kings and queens, and spoke in Middle Tamil. Viewers expressed positive comments about the concept and were later disappointed that the following two seasons of the show did not repeat the round to the same high standard. During the 2 February episode, dancer Priyadarshini gave a special performance to a medley of songs.

 – Special non-competition performance 
 – Contestant was in the bottom three (Vishnucharan)
 – Contestant was eliminated

Medley round 
 Compere: Divya
 Permanent voice trainer: Ananth Vaidyanathan
 Permanent judges: Mano
 Special guest judges: Harish Raghavendra and Pop Shalini 
 Performances:

The 8–11 February round required the remaining 14 contestants to sing a series of songs in a medley form.

 – Non-competition performance
 – Contestant advanced to next round (Priyanka, Sahana, Nithyashree, Ovviya)
 – Contestant was in the bottom three (Prasanna Sundar, Shrihari and Vishnucharan)
 – Contestant was eliminated

Love songs 
 Compere: Divya
 Permanent voice trainer: Ananth Vaidyanathan
 Permanent judges: K. S. Chithra and Mano 
 Performances:

The 14–18 February Kaadhal Geethangal round was split over two parts. First requiring contestants to sing a duet in pairs, then to sing another song as a solo performance. Judges granted immunity to the strongest duet performers, who were not required to give a competitive solo performance.

In the 15 February episode, Prem and Hamsadhwani, winners of the first season of the Vijay TV dance competition reality show, appeared as special guests. The duet performance of Nithyashree and Shrihari was dedicated to them, and followed by a brief duet dance by Nithyashree and Prem.

In the 16 February episode, Badava Gopi and Haritha Gopi appeared as special guests. The duet performance of Prasanna Sundar and Srinisha Jayaseelan was dedicated to them. Carnatic vocalist and playback singer Charulatha Mani and her husband Karthick also appeared as special guests. The trio performance by Shrikanth, Ovviya and Sharath was dedicated to them.

In the 17 February episode, Pushpavanam Kuppuswamy and Anitha Kuppuswamy appeared as special guests.

 – Non-competition performance
 – Contestant spot-selected to advance to next round
 – Contestant was in the bottom four (also Sahana)
 – Contestant was eliminated

Devotional songs 
 Compere: Uma Padmanabhan
 Permanent voice trainer: Ananth Vaidyanathan
 Permanent judges: K. S. Chithra and Mano
 Special guest judge: L. R. Eswari (23–24 April), Veeramani Raju (25 April)
 Performances:

The 22–25 February Bhakthi Padalgal round required the remaining 12 contestants to perform songs from the devotional genre. The first song was required to have been released in film. Contestants who were not spot-selected after their first song were required to perform a second song which had not yet been released in film.

In the second and third episodes this week, devotional playback singer L. R. Eswari appeared on the show as a guest judge and guest performer. Pastor Alwyn Thomas also appeared on the show for a special guest performance in the third episode of the round. In the fourth and final episode of the round, devotional singer Veeramani Raju appeared as a guest judge and guest performer. The compere for this round also provided a special performance in this episode before contestant SSJ06 Prasanna Sundar delivered a well-received performance of a "rare" and "difficult" song popularised by Nithyasree Mahadevan.

 – Non-competition performance  
 – Contestant spot-selected to advance to next round with immunity
 – Contestant was in the bottom three
 – Contestant was eliminated

Vinnaithaandi Varuvaaya special 
 Compere: Divya
 Permanent voice trainer: Ananth Vaidyanathan
 Permanent judges: Malgudi Shubha, K. S. Chithra and Mano
 Special guest for 1 March 2010 and 2 March 2010 episodes: Gautham Vasudev Menon
 Performances:

The 1–4 March round promoted the release of the film Vinnaithaandi Varuvaayaa, directed by Gautham Vasudev Menon and starring actor Silambarasan ("Simbu"). The first part of the round required the remaining 11 contestants to sing songs from Tamil films directed by Menon, who appeared as a special guest judge. Playback singer Vijay Prakash gave a special performance to open the round. The second part of the round required the contestants to sing songs from films starring actor Simbu.

 – Non-competition performance 
 – Contestant spot-selected to advance to next round
 – Contestant was in the bottom three
 – Contestant was eliminated

Final ten round 
 Compere: Divya
 Special guest judges: Suchithra Karthik Kumar & Naresh Iyer 
 Performances:

The 8–11 March round marked there being 10 remaining contestants and had no elimination.  Instead, special prizes of 1 lakh (100,000 rupees) were awarded to the best male and best female performance from the round. The prizes went to Shrikanth for male performance and was split between Alka Ajith and Nithyashree for female performance. Srinisha was given special recognition by the guest judges.

Playback singer Suchithra Karthik Kumar made her first appearance on the show, as a guest judge for this round. Playback singer Naresh Iyer also appeared as a guest judge, and had competed in the first season of Airtel Super Singer.

New songs 
 Compere: Divya
 Permanent voice trainer: Ananth Vaidyanathan
 Permanent judges: Mano and Malgudi Subha 
 Performances:

The 15–18 March Pudhu Padalgal round required the remaining 10 contestants to sing songs from films released in 2008 and 2009. The first song was required to be a fast song, and the second song was required to be a melody song. Contestant SSJ16 Srinisha won immunity after performing her fast song. Contestant SSJ02 Alka Ajith was announced best performer of the melody song segment.

 – Non-competition performance
 – Contestant advanced to next round
 – Contestant was in the bottom four
 – Contestant was eliminated

Moon songs 
 Compere: Divya
 Permanent voice trainer: Ananth Vaidyanathan
 Permanent judges: K. S. Chithra, Mano and Malgudi Subha 
 Special guest judge: P. B. Sreenivas (22 March only)
 Performances:

The 22–25 March Nila Padalgal round required the remaining nine contestants to perform songs over two parts which fit the theme of "the moon". The set was transformed and everyone was dressed in white to complement the theme.

The first part of the round required contestants to sing songs from films released before 1980. The special guest of the week was veteran playback singer, P. B. Sreenivas, who was well known for this subgenre. After the performance of contestant SSJ18 Sharath, Sreenivas sang the first line of the song when giving his feedback on the performance.

The second part of the round required contestants to sing hits from films released after 1980. Contestant SSJ02 Alka Ajith was announced the best performer of this part of the round, followed by contestants SSJ11 Nithyashree and SSJ21 Priyanka.

 – Non-competition performance 
 – Contestant was in the bottom two
 – Contestant was eliminated

Retro songs 
 Compere: Divya
 Permanent voice trainer: Ananth Vaidyanathan
 Permanent judges: Mano and Malgudi Subha 
 Performances:

The 29 March – 1 April round required the remaining eight contestants to sing songs of a retro theme.

 – Special non-competitive performance 
 – Contestant granted immunity to advance to next round
 – Contestant was in danger zone (bottom three)
 – Contestant was eliminated

Award-winning songs 
 Compere: Divya
 Permanent voice trainer: Ananth Vaidyanathan
 Permanent judges: K. S. Chithra, Mano and Malgudi Subha 
 Special guest judges: P. Susheela (6 April),  S. Janaki (7–8 April)
 Performances:

The 5–8 April round required the remaining seven contestants to perform national award-winning songs.  In the first part of the round, the best two performers, Srinisha and Shravan, were given an award by playback singer P. Susheela and immunity to advance to the next round. The other contestants sang another song on the theme; the worst of these three then had to perform state award-winning songs, and the worst two of those had to perform brand new songs. Nithyashree was ultimately the bottom performer, however special guest S. Janaki requested that no one be eliminated and the judges agreed.

 – Special non-competitive performance 
 – Contestant granted immunity to advance to next round
 – Contestant was in danger zone

Chithirai Thiruvizha special 
 Compere: Aishwarya
 Trainers & Permanent judges: Mano, K. S. Chithra and Malgudi Subha 
 Performances:

The 12–15 April round celebrated Chithirai Thiruvizha. Instead of an elimination there was special prize for impressing the judges, who performed with them.  Mano considered Alka Ajith was the most impressive, Malgudi Shubha considered Srinisha was the most impressive and Chithra considered Nithyashree the most impressive.

 – Special solo performance by judge

Unplugged round 
 Compere: Divya
 Permanent voice trainer: Ananth Vaidyanathan
 Permanent judges: K. S. Chithra, Mano and Malgudi Subha 
 Special guest musicians: Thumba Raja (percussionist), Selvaraj (strings) and Augustin (grand pianist) (19–20 April); Stephen Devassy (grand pianist), Thumba Raja (percussionist) and Selvaraj (strings) (21–22 April)
 Performances:

The 19–22 April round required the remaining seven contestants to perform songs in an "unplugged" format. The contestants were accompanied by special-guest musicians.

In relation to the musicians who made their TV debut appearance on the show, the compere announced that:
 the percussionist Thumba Raja had worked in the music industry for 30 years, and worked for several music directors including M. S. Viswanathan and Harris Jayaraj.
 Selvaraj had worked in the music industry for 35 years, and worked for about 75 music directors including A. R. Rahman and G. V. Prakash.
 the 18-year-old pianist, Augustin, was a child prodigy. He traveled to Europe to complete his musical studies at an early age, and after completing grade 8 of his piano examinations, completed his diploma at Trinity College London. He also trained under Murray McLauchlan.

The bottom three performers from the unplugged songs were given five minutes to learn another song before performing it.  Based on those performances the judges eliminated Prasanna Sundar from the competition.

 – Non-competition performance 
 – Contestant granted immunity to advance to next round
 – Contestant was in danger zone 
 – Contestant was eliminated

Tribute to MSV 
 Compere: Divya
 Permanent voice trainer: Ananth Vaidyanathan
 Permanent judges: Mano and Malgudi Subha 
 Special guest judge: M. S. Viswanathan
 Performances:

The 26–29 April round required the remaining six contestants to perform songs from films that had the music director M. S. Viswanathan, a 55-year veteran of the industry.  This was the last ordinary round before the semi-finals.

At the end of each episode's performances, the best-judged contestant was given immunity and advanced to the next round. Priyanka was eliminated.

 – Non-competition performance 
 – Contestant won immunity and advanced to next round
 – Contestant was in the bottom 
 – Contestant was eliminated

Finals

Semi-finals part one 
 Compere: Divya
 Permanent voice trainer: Ananth Vaidyanathan
 Permanent judges: K. S. Chithra, Mano and Malgudi Subha 
 Special guest musicians: Naveen Kumar (flautist), Vikram (percussionist), Mani (bass guitarist) and Shyam (pianist)
 Performances:

The semi-finals began with the 2–6 May round which required the remaining five contestants to perform in a quick-fire competition, accompanied by special guest musicians. Srinisha was eliminated.

 – Non-competition performance 
 – Contestant won and advanced to next round
 – Contestant was in the bottom two
 – Contestant was eliminated

Semi-finals part two 
 Compere: Divya
 Permanent voice trainer: Ananth Vaidyanathan
 Permanent judges: K. S. Chithra, Mano and Malgudi Subha 
 Special guest judges & trainers: Nithyasree Mahadevan, Suchithra Karthik Kumar & Harish Raghavendra
 Performances:

The semi-finals concluded with the 10–13 May round which required the remaining four contestants to perform in another quick-fire competition. Each contestant was required to sing: 
 a song in the Carnatic classical genre together with eminent Carnatic vocalist and playback singer Nithyasree Mahadevan; 
 a song in the Western genre together with playback singer Suchithra Karthik Kumar; and
 a song in the Melody genre together with playback singer Harish Raghavendra.

The contestants received additional training from each of the above playback singers for this round, in addition to their usual training from Ananth Vaidyanathan. At the conclusion of the episode, Nithyashree was eliminated.

 – Non-competition performance 
 – Contestant advanced as direct finalist
 – Contestant was in the bottom two
 – Contestant was eliminated

Wild card entry round 
 Compere: Divya
 Permanent voice trainer: Ananth Vaidyanathan
 Wild card entry judges: Srinivas, Unni Menon, Madhu Balakrishnan, Sowmya and Annupamaa
 Performances:

The 17–20 May round allowed contestants who had been eliminated in fifteenth to sixth place in the main competition an opportunity to perform for a chance to re-enter the competition in the wild card round.  (Eliminated semi-finalists were automatically entitled to perform in the public wild card round.)  In the first part of this round, the wild card entry judges selected two contestants to advance to the public wild card round.

 – Non-competition performance 
 – Top two contestants selected to advance to next round
 – Top five contestants in this round

 Compere: Divya
 Permanent voice trainer: Ananth Vaidyanathan
 Permanent judges: K. S. Chithra, Mano and Malgudi Subha 
 Special guest judge: Sadhana Sargam
 Performances:

In the second part of the wild card entry round, 19–20 May, the remaining eight eliminated contestants were given another opportunity to perform. At the conclusion of this round, two more were selected to enter the public wild card round.

 – Non-competition performance 
 – Contestant selected to advance to next round
 –

Wild card round 
 Compere: Divya
 Permanent voice trainer: Ananth Vaidyanathan
 Permanent judges: Mano and Malgudi Subha 
 Special guest judges: Nithyasree Mahadevan and Unni Menon

The 24–27 May wild card round had the six wild card contestants compete for a chance to re-enter the competition. Over four episodes, they performed "mass entertainment" songs, "philosophical" songs, South Indian "folk" songs, and "challenging" songs. Throughout the week, the public were invited to vote for their favourite wild card contestants.

Wild card results 
 Compere: Divya
 Permanent voice trainer: Ananth Vaidyanathan
 Permanent judges: Mano and Malgudi Subha 
 Special guest: M. Balamuralikrishna

The 31 May – 3 June round recognized contestants with the SSJ Awards and also announced the wild card winners – Srikanth and Nithyashree – who entered the finals along with Alka Ajith, Roshan and Shravan.

The wild card results created frustrations and disappointments among Vijay TV viewers citing that the public votes were manipulated and played no role in the results. Various blogs were very much in favour of the wild card winner as Priyanka followed by Srinisha. Views have been aired that Srikanth and Nithyashree though talented pose no competency to the other finalists in the final round.

Finals 
The finals consisted of eight episodes telecast over two weeks, 7–16 June.

The finalists were required to perform songs of the Carnatic classical genre, the South Indian "folk" music genre, the Western melody genre, and a fast tempo song of a Western genre.

Grand finale 

 Host: Sivakarthikeyan & Divya
 Chief Guests: Karthi and Amala
 Judges: M. S. Viswanathan, P. B. Sreenivas, Malaysia Vasudevan, Unni Menon, Nithyasree Mahadevan, Manikka Vinayagam, Prashanthini, Vinaya, Shwetha Mohan, Ramesh Vinayakam, Mahathi, Srinivas, K. S. Chithra, Mano, Malgudi Subha and Ananth Vaidyanathan
 Performances:

The grand finale was telecast live on 17 June 2010, and exceeded three hours. The five grand finalists were Shravan Pratap, Alka Ajith, Roshan Sebastin, Srikanth, and Nithyashree.

Grand finale results 

The results of the competition and prizes awarded at the grand finale were as follows:

References

External links 
 Official Super Singer Junior Forum
 Super singer vote

2010 Tamil-language television seasons
Star Vijay original programming